Barbara Buffaloe (born November 2, 1980) is an American politician who is the Mayor of Columbia, Missouri, currently serving her first term in office. As Mayor she is chair of the Columbia City Council. She won the 2022 Columbia, Missouri mayoral election with 43 percent of the vote. Before becoming Mayor she was the city sustainability manager for eleven years. She is the second female Mayor, and with her election women outnumber men on the city council for the first time.

References

1980 births
21st-century American politicians
Mayors of Columbia, Missouri
Living people
Missouri city council members
University of Missouri alumni
21st-century American women politicians